Nepal Army Club, also known as Tribhuwan Army Club, is the departmental Army sporting club of Nepal and is based in Kathmandu. In cricket they play top domestic league National League Cricket, and in Prime Minister One Day Cup whereas in football they currently play in the top division of the country Martyr's Memorial A-Division League.

History 
The departmental army team under the name of Army XI had won the fourth A-division league in 1957/58. It has placed in between second to fifth position in the league in recent years. Nepal Army Club have first time received AFC Club license in the Nepali football history on 2020.

Cricket

Record

Squad

Football

Record

Squad

AFC Cup performance 
2021 – Preliminary round 2

Continental record

Volleyball

Players 
Man Bahadur Shrestha

Trophies 
Nepal National Volleyball League
Winners (4): 2016, 2017, 2018, 2019

See also 
Nepalese Army
Nepal Police Club
APF Club
Martyr's Memorial A-Division League

External links 
 Sports at Nepal Army

References 

Football clubs in Nepal
1951 establishments in Nepal
Cricket teams in Nepal
Military association football clubs